Thierry Lepeltier (born 1962) is a former French slalom canoeist who competed in the 1980s and the 1990s. He won a silver medal in the C-1 team event at the 1989 ICF Canoe Slalom World Championships in Savage River.

References

French male canoeists
Living people
Medalists at the ICF Canoe Slalom World Championships
1962 births